Jéssica Pauletto (born 19 April 1990) is a Brazilian fashion model.

Biography 
Jéssica Pauletto was born in the town of Bento Gonçalves, State of Rio Grande do Sul, 125 km away from the State's capital Porto Alegre. She is the daughter of a Brazilian industrialist. Her family was originating from the Region of Veneto, Italy.

Like Alessandra Ambrósio, Gisele Bündchen, Caroline Trentini and many other Brazilian models from Rio Grande do Sul, Jéssica Pauletto made her début with the modeling school of Dilson Stein. She joined the agency Marilyn in São Paulo at the end of 2004, and within a year she was already a very much sought-after model.

In January 2005 she participated in the São Paulo Fashion Week (SPFW), and she won the first edition of the Dream Tim contest as best "new face". During the SPFW she walked for 29 different fashion designers. Still during the 2005 winter season, Jéssica participated in the Rio Fashion Week" and was elected best model. Shortly after that she went to New York City and settled there. In 2006 she went to Japan for some months and worked with L'Oréal Japan, Elle, Elle Girl and with the catalogue of the Japanese department stores Isetan. In 2006 the review Folha included her among the 25 most famous Brazilian models.

Jéssica has appeared in many editorials of magazines, including:

 Vogue (Brazil) (twice)
 Vogue Teen
 Elle (Argentina)
 Elle Girl
 Glamour (Italy)
 Marie Claire (twice)
 Simples Magazine
 SPFW Review

She has been the face of a variety of advertising campaigns of Brazilian fashion houses, including:
 Arezzo
 Triton
 Vide Bula
 Lucy in the Sky
 Saad

She has modeled for the catalogue of the Brazilian fashion house Maria Bonita, and has posed for the following Brazilian photographers:
 André Schiliró
 Cristiano Pio de Almeida
 Jacques Dequeker
 Marcelo Nunes
 Miro

In 2007 Jéssica took a year off due to health problems. But she reappeared more beautiful than ever at the 2008 Winter SPFW, where she made the catwalk for a dozen of fashion companies including Iodice, Triton, Giselle Nasser and Amapô. Subsequently, she went again to Japan. In 2010 she was signed by the ANC Agency in Hamburg, Germany.

See also 
 São Paulo Fashion Week

Notes and references

External links 
 
 Photo Gallery of Jéssica Pauletto at ANC
 Photo Gallery of Jéssica Pauletto at dilsonstein.com 
 Photo Gallery of Jéssica Pauletto at fotolog.com 
 Profile of Jéssica Pauletto at assuntodemodelo.br 
 Photo of Jéssica Pauletto at modareverenda – Marisa 

Brazilian female models
Brazilian people of Italian descent
People from Rio Grande do Sul
1990 births
Living people